Kinzig is the name of three rivers in southern Germany:

 Kinzig (Main), flowing into the Main
 Kinzig (Mümling), flowing into the Mümling, a tributary of the Main
 Kinzig (Rhine), flowing into the Rhine